The Flipper is an American sailboat that was designed by Carter Pyle and Joe Quigg as a daysailer intended for children, first built in 1966.

Named for the period TV series, the boat is sometimes confused with the 1970 Danish Flipper dinghy, sometimes called the Flipper Export, of which 15,000 were built.

Production
The design was built by Mobjack Manufacturing in Gloucester, Virginia and Newport Boats in Newport, California, United States. A total of 582 boats were completed starting in 1966, but it is now out of production.

Design
The Flipper is a recreational sailing dinghy, built predominantly of fiberglass, with wood trim. The hull bottom is foam-filled, making it unsinkable. It has an unstayed catboat rig, a nearly plumb stem, a vertical transom, a transom-hung rudder controlled by a tiller with an extension and a removable daggerboard. The hull displaces  fully-rigged.

For sailing the design is equipped with boom vang and a center boom-mounted mainsheet.

See also
List of sailing boat types

References

External links

Dinghies
1960s sailboat type designs
Sailboat types built in the United States
Sailboat type designs by Carter Pyle
Sailboat type designs by Joe Quigg
Sailboat types built by Newport Boats
Sailboat types built by Mobjack Manufacturing